Kharij (also Romanized as Kharīj; also known as Kharach, Kharīch, and Khirch) is a village in Radkan Rural District, in the Central District of Chenaran County, Razavi Khorasan Province, Iran. At the 2006 census, its population was 361, in 95 families.

References 

Populated places in Chenaran County